The fifth season of Esta historia me suena (shown on screen as Esta historia me suena: Vol. 5) aired on Las Estrellas from 13 June 2022 to 15 July 2022. The season is produced by Genoveva Martínez and Televisa. The season consists of twenty-five episodes.

Notable guest stars 

 Adriana Nieto
 Wendy de los Cobos
 Geraldine Galván
 Jade Fraser
 Leticia Perdigón
 Luis Xavier
 Alpha Acosta
 Josh Gutiérrez
 Lupita Lara
 Adalberto Parra
 Helena Rojo
 Mauricio Barcelata
 Amaranta Ruíz
 Aida Pierce
 Isaura Espinoza
 Diana Golden
 Mariana Ochoa
 Violeta Isfel
 Alejandro Tommasi
 Mané de la Parra
 Gaby Mellado
 Mónica Dionne
 Aleida Núñez
 Ariel López Padilla
 Alberto Estrella
 Luz María Jerez
 Paty Díaz
 Maribel Fernández
 Ignacio Guadalupe
 Carlos Espejel
 Carmen Becerra
 Ivonne Montero
 Anna Ciocchetti
 Eric del Castillo

Episodes

Notes

References 

2022 Mexican television seasons